Stephen O. Murray (May 4, 1950 – August 27, 2019) was an American anthropologist, sociologist, and independent scholar based in San Francisco, California. He was known for extensive scholarly work on the sociology, anthropology, and comparative history of sexual and gender minorities, on sociolinguistics, history of the social sciences, and as an important editor and organizer of scholarly work in these areas.

Early life and education
Stephen Murray grew up in rural Minnesota. A member of the second class at James Madison College within Michigan State University, Stephen Murray had an undergraduate double major in social psychology and in Justice, Morality, and Constitutional Democracy. He earned his M.A. degree from the University of Arizona in sociology in 1975, and a Ph.D. from the University of Toronto, also in sociology in 1979, and then undertook post-doctoral training in anthropology at the University of California, Berkeley (1980-1982).

Career
His work included studies in sociolinguistics, history of social sciences (anthropology, sociology, linguistics), and extensive publications on the historical and cross-cultural social organizations of homosexuality. His main areas of fieldwork were in North America United States Mexico, Canada, and Taiwan (with his partner Keelung Hong). He also co-edited books on homosexualities in sub-Saharan Africa and across the Islamic world with Will Roscoe.

With Regna Darnell, he co-edited the monographic series "Critical Studies in the History of Anthropology" for the University of Nebraska Press. He worked for more than a decade in public health with California county health departments and also wrote on public health issues, particularly in regard to HIV/AIDS.

He held positions on the editorial boards of several social science journals including the Journal of Homosexuality and the Histories of Anthropology Annual, and was a contributor to the online encyclopedia of gay, lesbian, bisexual, transgender and queer culture, GLBTQ and other reference volumes. He was a regular contributor at epinions.com and associatedcontent.com.

Stephen Murray died in San Francisco, California on August 27, 2019 of complications of a B-cell lymphoma.

Selected publications

 (Rev. ed. of Theory groups and the study of language in North America: a social history (1994).

References

External links
Stephen Murray at glbtq: An Encyclopedia of Gay, Lesbian, Bisexual, Transgender, and Queer Culture.

1950 births
2019 deaths
Michigan State University alumni
University of Arizona alumni
American sociologists
Cultural anthropologists
LGBT anthropologists
American gay writers
American sexologists
American anthropologists
American LGBT scientists
Gay scientists
Independent scholars
Deaths from lymphoma